Big Brother 19 is the nineteenth season of various versions of television show Big Brother and may refer to:

 Big Brother 19 (U.S.), the 2017 edition of the U.S. version
 Big Brother 19 (UK), the 2018 edition of the UK version
 Big Brother Brasil 19, the 2019 edition of the Brazilian version